Paganini was a hard rock band from Switzerland that was founded by Marc Paganini and guitarist Ralph Murthy.

The band signed with Vertigo Records and in 1985 released its debut album, Weapon of Love. The video/single, "Berlin by Night", was part of the soundtrack for the German movie .

Paganini recorded five studio albums between 1985 and 2008.  The band enjoyed, minor success with Weapon of Love, which they supported by joining Mötley Crüe on their 1986 Theatre of Pain Tour.

The 1987 follow-up album, It's A Long Way to the Top, charted at number six on the Swiss album charts.  Subsequent albums were released on smaller labels with different line-ups centered around Marc Paganini. 

Weapon of Love and It’s A Long Way to the Top were both re-mastered and re-issued by German label Yesterrock in 2009. 

Murthy died on September 15, 2013, due to liver failure. Marc Paganini died on January 11, 2019, from unknown causes.

Discography

Studio albums

References

External links
Paganini official website

Swiss hard rock musical groups